Markus Frei (born 3 March 1952) is a Swiss football manager.

References

1952 births
Living people
Swiss football managers
FC St. Gallen managers
Place of birth missing (living people)
20th-century Swiss people